Leo Taylor may refer to:

Musicians

Leo Taylor, drummer for London-based band The Invisible and Hot Chip collaborator
Leo Taylor, drummer for Bristol-based band Area 11

Others
Leo Taylor (EastEnders), fictional character
Leo Taylor (baseball) (1901–1982), American Major League Baseball player
Leo Taylor (Canadian football), Canadian football player